Shelley Mayer (born March 6, 1952) is an American politician serving as a Democratic member of the New York State Senate representing the 37th Senate District, which includes portions of Westchester County. Formerly a member of the New York State Assembly, Mayer was first elected in a special election in 2018.

Background 
Born and raised in Yonkers, Mayer went on to receive her B.A. at University of California, Los Angeles, and later her J.D. at the University at Buffalo Law School.

Prior to her election to public office, Mayer was a Senior Counsel at the National State Attorney General Program at Columbia University, where she focused on health care and labor law rights. From 2007 until early 2011, Shelley worked as Chief Counsel to the New York State Senate Conference in Albany.

For over seven years, she served as Vice President of Government and Community Affairs at Continuum Health Partners in New York City. From 1982 to 1994, Mayer served as an Assistant Attorney General in the office of New York Attorney General Bob Abrams. She served in the Civil Rights Bureau, as Chief of the Westchester Regional Office, as the legislative liaison for the Attorney General and ultimately as a senior advisor to the Attorney General.

In 2006, Mayer made her first run for public office, losing a bid for the New York State Assembly to incumbent Republican Mike Spano. Spano later went on to change parties, ran for Mayor of Yonkers in 2011 as a Democrat, and won.

Mayer was first elected to the New York State Assembly on March 20, 2012, in a special election to succeed Mike Spano, and was re-elected three times.

Mayer lives in Yonkers with her husband, Lee Smith, with whom she has three adult children.

New York Senate 
Mayer was elected to the State Senate in a special election held on April 24, 2018 after the office was vacated by Westchester County Executive George Latimer. Mayer appeared on the Democratic, Working Families, and Women's Equality Party lines and won by a margin of 57% to 43%. Mayer attributed the win to a "'big tent blue wave' that brought together progressives, Democrats, union groups and female activists."

Later in 2018, despite the district being deemed competitive by pundits, Mayer was unopposed for a full-term.  With Democrats retaking the majority, Mayer is serving as Chair of Committee on Education.

References

External links
Official Senate website
Campaign Website

 

1952 births
Jewish American state legislators in New York (state)
Jewish women politicians
Living people
Democratic Party members of the New York State Assembly
Democratic Party New York (state) state senators
People from Yonkers, New York
University of California, Los Angeles alumni
University at Buffalo alumni
Women state legislators in New York (state)
21st-century American politicians
21st-century American women politicians
21st-century American Jews